There were three Modern pentathlon events at the 2018 South American Games in Cochabamba, Bolivia. One for men, one for women and one mixed. The events were held between June 6 and 8 at the Coliseo Suramericano. All countries competing in each individual event had the right to enter athletes for the 2019 Pan American Games in Lima, Peru in the respective events.

Medal summary

Medal table

Medalists

See also
Modern pentathlon at the 2019 Pan American Games – Qualification

References

External links
Results

2018 South American Games events
South American Games
2018
Qualification tournaments for the 2019 Pan American Games